P. L. Sundaram is an Indian politician and incumbent Member of the Tamil Nadu Legislative Assembly from the Bhavanisagar constituency from 2011 to 2016. He represents the Communist Party of India party He is known for his humbleness and down to earth capability.

References 

Communist Party of India politicians from Tamil Nadu
Members of the Tamil Nadu Legislative Assembly
Living people
Year of birth missing (living people)